Friedrich Albin Hoffmann (13 November 1843, Ruhrort – 13 November 1924, Leipzig) was a German internist.

He studied medicine in Würzburg, Tübingen and Berlin, and after graduation (1868), he became an assistant to Friedrich Theodor von Frerichs (1819-1885) in the First Medical Clinic at the University of Berlin. In 1872 he became habilitated for special pathology and therapy (internal medicine), and from 1874 was a professor of internal medicine at the University of Dorpat. From 1886 to 1920 he served as a professor of internal medicine and director of the university polyclinic in Leipzig.

He was considered an excellent diagnostician, dedicated to histological research in the field of internal medicine. His primary focus dealt with diseases of the bronchi and mediastinum as well as blood and metabolic disorders.

With Paul Langerhans (1847-1888), he investigated the "intravital storage" of cinnabar injected intravenously into laboratory animals. The two scientists demonstrated that cinnabar was taken up by white blood corpuscles but not by red blood corpuscles. They also noted the accumulation of cinnabar in fixed cells of the bone marrow, in the connective tissue of the liver and in the capillary system. These findings were part of the research that later spawned Ludwig Aschoff’s idea of the reticuloendothelial system.

Selected writings 
 Ueber Contractilitätsvorgänge im vorderen Epithelium der Froschhornhaut, Berlin 1868. (graduate thesis)
 Experimental-Studien über Diabetes, Berlin 1874. (with Carl Alfred Bock) - Experimental studies on diabetes.
 Betrachtungen über absolute Milchdiät, Berlin 1884 -  Reflections on an absolute milk diet.
 Lehrbuch der Constitutionskrankheiten, Stuttgart 1893.
 Erkrankungen des Mediastinums, Vienna 1896. Diseases of the mediastinum.
 Die Reichsversicherungsordnung nach der Vorlesung über soziale Medizin für Juristen und Ärzte, Leipzig 1921.

References 

German internists
1924 deaths
1843 births
People from Duisburg
Academic staff of Leipzig University
Academic staff of the University of Tartu
19th-century German physicians
20th-century German physicians